The 2020–21 Lafayette Leopards men's basketball team represented Lafayette College in the 2020–21 NCAA Division I men's basketball season. The Leopards, led by 26th-year head coach Fran O'Hanlon, play their home games at the Kirby Sports Center in Easton, Pennsylvania as members of the Patriot League. With the creation of mini-divisions to cut down on travel due to the COVID-19 pandemic, they play in the Central Division.

Previous season
The Leopards finished the 2019–20 season 19–12, 10–8 in Patriot League play to finish in a tie for fourth place. They defeated Army in the quarterfinals of the Patriot League tournament, before losing in the semifinals to Colgate.

Roster

Schedule and results 

|-
!colspan=12 style=| Patriot League regular season

|-
!colspan=12 style=| Patriot League tournament
|-

|-

Source

References

Lafayette Leopards men's basketball seasons
Lafayette Leopards
Lafayette Leopards men's basketball
Lafayette Leopards men's basketball